Riverside Rugby Club competes in the Southern California Rugby Football Union. Riverside's style of play has been described as "Southern Hemisphere" Rugby.  This style, popularized by New Zealand, Tonga and Fiji, emphasizes back-play over forward play, and focuses on quick ball movement and a high work rate. Riverside R.C. is best known for winning back-to-back titles at the 2003 and 2004 USA Rugby Club Sevens National Championship.

Teams 
Men's A team- Killer Bees
Men's 7s A team-Killer Bees

Team Accomplishments 

Riverside Rugby has distinguished itself with the following accomplishments:
2008 SCRFU White Division Champion
2008 National Sweet 16 Qualifier 2nd Division
2004 USA 7’s Champion
2004 National Sweet 16 Qualifier 1st division
2004 SCRFU Red division Champion (perfect 12-0 1st division record)
2003 USA 7’s Champion
2003 USA 2nd Division champion
2003 SCRFU White division Champion
2000 National Sweet 16 Qualifier 2nd division

Capped Players 

Being selected to play for a national team is one of Rugby's highest honors.  The following current and former Riverside players have played for a national team.

Malakai Delai (USA)
Tui Osborne (USA)
Nelo Lui (USA)

Criticisms 

Riverside has been a very inconsistent team.  The club did not win in 2002. Two years later, Riverside was undefeated in 2004 in the highest SCRFU division.  In 2006, the club again had the worst record in SCRFU, and was relegated.  In 2008, the club won the white division, and made the play-offs.

Player development 
There are many factors that can cause such inconsistent performance.  One argument is that too much of Riverside's talent is concentrated in a few players.  Over the years, Riverside has demonstrated an ability to recruit top-tier Fijian-American, Tongan-American and Samoan-American players.  Some have argued that the club has not done enough to develop local talent, which makes it very dependent on these key players.

Club status 
Another challenge for Riverside is that the club may is under-capitalized for the level of performance expected by Riverside fans.  The more consistent high powered Southern California teams, such as OMBAC and Belmont Shores, are well capitalized, well run professional sports organizations, that can provide the training facilities and resources expected by top rugby professionals in the United States.

Sponsorship 
Unlike the Super League, SCRFU does not have a national sponsor that shares operating costs with the teams.  Riverside is supported by a combination of member dues and secondary sponsorships

External links 
Official Site
USA Rugby

References 

Sports in Riverside, California
Rugby union teams in California
Rugby clubs established in 1976
1976 establishments in California